Patrick Majewski (born December 23, 1979) is a retired Polish American professional boxer who was the NABF Middleweight professional boxing champion. He was the highest world ranked Polish boxer based in the United States along with former Heavyweight contender Tomasz Adamek during his career. Nicknamed 'The Machine', Majewski was a wrestler in high school who also excelled in Karate. Majewski went to college to become a teacher in Poland, but later moved Atlantic City, New Jersey in the United States.

Amateur career

After coming to the United States on a student visa exchange visa, Majewski took up amateur boxing. As an amateur, Majewski won the Pennsylvania Golden Gloves title at 165 pounds twice.

Professional career

Majewski began his pro career in 2006 late at age 26 with a 17 fight win streak, including a ten-round decision win over Marcus Upshaw to win the vacant WBO NABO middleweight title in 2011.

On July 7, 2012, Majewski won the vacant NABF middleweight title with a fifth round stoppage over Irish Chris Fitzpatrick at Bally's Atlantic City Hotel Casino in Atlantic City, New Jersey.

Training Background

Majewski's first trainer in Atlantic City was James 'Rocky' McRae. Currently, Majewski is trained by Atlantic City-based trainers Arnold Robbins and Bill Johnson, father the late world lightweight titleholder Leavander Johnson. Majewski is promoted by Global Boxing Promotions, which promotes professional boxing and Mixed Martial Arts (MMA) fighters, as well as amateur boxing.

Acting career

Majewski knocks down his opponent, but subsequently gets knocked out in an imaginary middleweight title bout in season one, episode 8 of the 2012 Spanish television series Cloroformo.

Professional Boxing Record

|-
|align="center" colspan=8|21 Wins (13 knockouts), 3 Losses, 0 Draw
|-
|align=center style="border-style: none none solid solid; background: #e3e3e3"|Result
|align=center style="border-style: none none solid solid; background: #e3e3e3"|Record
|align=center style="border-style: none none solid solid; background: #e3e3e3"|Opponent
|align=center style="border-style: none none solid solid; background: #e3e3e3"|Type
|align=center style="border-style: none none solid solid; background: #e3e3e3"|Round
|align=center style="border-style: none none solid solid; background: #e3e3e3"|Date
|align=center style="border-style: none none solid solid; background: #e3e3e3"|Location
|align=center style="border-style: none none solid solid; background: #e3e3e3"|Notes
|-align=center
|Loss
|21–3
|align=left| Curtis Stevens
| TKO || 1 
|2014-01-24 || align=left| Resorts International, Atlantic City, New Jersey, USA
|align=left|
|-align=center
|Loss
|21–2
|align=left| Patrick Nielsen
| UD || 12 
|2013-09-08 || align=left| Frederikshavn
|align=left|
|-align=center
|Win
|21–1
|align=left| Jamaal Davis
| UD || 10 
|2013-02-23 || align=left| Atlantic City, New Jersey
|align=left| 
|-align=center
|Win
|20–1
|align=left| Latif Mundy
| MD || 10 
|2012-09-29 || align=left| Atlantic City, New Jersey
|align=left|
|-align=center
|Win
|19–1
|align=left| Chris Fitzpatrick	
| RTD || 5 
|2012-07-07 || align=left| Atlantic City, New Jersey
|align=left| 
|-align=center
|Win
|18–1
|align=left| Antwun Echols
| TKO || 3 
|2012-04-07 || align=left| Southaven, Mississippi
|align=left|
|-align=center
|Loss
|17–1
|align=left| Jose Miguel Torres
| TKO || 6 
|2011-11-05 || align=left| Uncasville, Connecticut
|align=left| 
|-align=center
|Win
|17–0
|align=left| Marcus Upshaw
| UD || 10 
|2011-06-11 || align=left| Southaven, Mississippi
|align=left|   
|-align=center
|Win
|16–0
|align=left| Allen Medina
| TKO || 1 
|2011-04-01 || align=left| Philadelphia, Pennsylvania
|align=left|
|-align=center
|Win
|15–0
|align=left| Eddie Caminero
| TKO || 8 
|2010-12-09 || align=left| Newark, New Jersey
|align=left|
|-align=center
|Win
|14–0
|align=left| Joe Gomez
| TKO || 7 
|2010-10-16 || align=left| Kissimmee, Florida
|align=left|
|-align=center
|Win
|13–0
|align=left| Loren Myers	
| TKO || 6 
|2010-05-22 || align=left| Atlantic City, New Jersey
|align=left| 
|-align=center
|Win
|12–0
|align=left| Anthony Pietrantonio
| UD || 6 
|2010-02-06 || align=left| Newark, New Jersey
|align=left|
|-align=center
|Win
|11–0
|align=left| Latif Mundy
| UD || 8 
|2009-06-06 || align=left| Atlantic City, New Jersey
|align=left|
|-align=center
|Win
|10–0
|align=left| Jimmy Lubash
| TKO || 7 
|2009-04-24 || align=left| Newark, New Jersey
|align=left|
|-align=center
|Win
|9–0
|align=left| Danny Rivera
| RTD || 5 
|2008-11-25 || align=left| Melville, New York
|align=left|
|-align=center
|Win
|8–0
|align=left| Ariel Espinal
| UD || 4 
|2008-05-09 || align=left| Atlantic City, New Jersey
|align=left|
|-align=center
|Win
|7–0
|align=left| Victor Paz
| TKO || 2 
|2008-02-15 || align=left| Atlantic City, New Jersey
|align=left|
|-align=center
|Win
|6–0
|align=left| Nick Collins
| KO || 1 
|2007-11-10 || align=left| Wildwood, New Jersey
|align=left|
|-align=center
|Win
|5–0
|align=left| Maurice Williams
| UD || 4 
|2007-08-31 || align=left| Atlantic City, New Jersey
|align=left|
|-align=center
|Win
|4–0
|align=left| Vincent Irwin
| TKO || 3 
|2007-06-02 || align=left| Atlantic City, New Jersey
|align=left|
|-align=center
|Win
|3–0
|align=left| Esteban Cordova
| UD || 4 
|2007-02-16 || align=left| Franklin Square, New York
|align=left|
|-align=center
|Win
|2–0
|align=left| Ken Dunham
| TKO || 2 
|2006-12-24 || align=left| New York, New York
|align=left|
|-align=center
|Win
|1–0
|align=left| Terry Peacock
| TKO || 2 
|2006-09-20 || align=left| New York, New York
|
|-align=center

References

External links
 

1979 births
Living people
People from Radom
Sportspeople from Masovian Voivodeship
Polish male boxers
Middleweight boxers